Murray Bridge North is a semi-rural satellite locality of Murray Bridge in South Australia east of the Murray River and northwest of the eponymous bridge. Its boundaries were formalised in March 2000 to cover a portion of land on either side of the main road to Mannum north of the main conurbation of Murray Bridge and west of the riverside industries of Mobilong and Toora.

See also
 List of cities and towns in South Australia

References 

Towns in South Australia